Diane Hansen may refer to:

Diane Hansen (skier), see Freestyle skiing at the 2007 Canada Games
Diane Hansen in Visions of Cody
Diane Hansen (pageant contestant), Miss Michigan
Diane Hansen, character in List of Person of Interest episodes